Douglas Billy Halbert Flack (24 October 1920 – 18 October 2005) was an English professional footballer who played in the Football League for Fulham and Walsall as a goalkeeper. After his retirement as a player, he managed Corinthian-Casuals and Tooting & Mitcham United.

Personal life 
Flack attended Spring Grove Grammar School. He served in India with the Royal Air Force during the Second World War.

Career statistics

Honours 
Fulham

 Football League Second Division: 1948–49

References 

Clapton Orient F.C. wartime guest players
English Football League players
English footballers
1920 births
Tottenham Hotspur F.C. wartime guest players
Association football goalkeepers
2005 deaths
People from Staines-upon-Thames
Corinthian F.C. players
Fulham F.C. players
Walsall F.C. players
Military personnel from Middlesex
Corinthian-Casuals F.C. managers
Tooting & Mitcham United F.C. managers
Isthmian League managers
English football managers
Royal Air Force personnel of World War II
West Ham United F.C. wartime guest players
Brighton & Hove Albion F.C. wartime guest players
Portsmouth F.C. wartime guest players
Reading F.C. wartime guest players
Chelmsford City F.C. wartime guest players